The FIS Ski Flying World Ski Championships 1994 took place on 20 March 1994 in Planica, Slovenia for the record fourth time. It also counted for World Cup. They previously hosted the championships as being part of Yugoslavia in 1972, 1979 and 1985. This was the first large international sporting event in Slovenia after they declared its independence in 1991 following the Ten-Day War.

Schedule

All jumps over 200 metres 
Chronological order:
202 metres (663 ft) – 17 March – Andreas Goldberger, WR crash (1RD, Practise)
203 metres (666 ft) – 17 March – Toni Nieminen WR (1RD, Practice)
202 metres (663 ft) – 17 March – Andreas Goldberger (2RD, Practise)
207 metres (679 ft) – 18 March – Christof Duffner WR crash (1RD, Official training)
209 metres (686 ft) – 18 March – Espen Bredesen WR (1RD, Official training)
201 metres (659 ft) – 18 March – Andreas Goldberger (2RD, Official training)
200 metres (656 ft) – 18 March – Jaroslav Sakala (2RD, Official training)

Fair play
Espen Bredesen (172 and 182 m) switched his silver medal with Roberto Cecon (160 and 199 m) bronze at the press conference after medal ceremony, as he deserved it more due to the rule which didn't allow to score jumps exceeding 191 metres.

Historic 200 metres barrier broken
On 17 March 1994 sports history was made. Austrian ski jumper Andreas Goldberger became the first person in history to jump over  barrier, but it didn't count, as he touched the snow with his hands at  during practice. 

Competition
On 17 March 1994 practise session with 36 on start in two rounds was on schedule with historic 200 metres barrier broken and started with WR by test jumper Martin Höllwarth at 196 metres. But Miran Tepeš was honoured to be the first, landing at 163 metres.

On 18 March 1994 official training in front of 20,000 people with two rounds were on schedule and third round was canceled due to strong wind. Before that 15 trial V-jumpers made practise test jumps. In the first round Christof Duffner crashed from a huge height at 207 metres (679 ft) metres world record distance. About 15 minutes later Espen Bredesen set the third and last world record that year at 209 metres (686 ft).

On 19 March 1994 first day of competition was on schedule but canceled due to strong. Unfortunate to 40,000 people visiting the event, crowd was very disappointed as they didn't manage to see a single jump that day.

On 20 March 1994 second day of competition was on schedule in front of 30,000 people and without any weather problems. The event marked the last time the 191 meters rule—jumps that exceeded the distance points didn't register further—was in use. At the time the single day event also counted for World Cup points and statistics. Only 2 of 4 jumps counted into final results. Czech Jaroslav Sakala became the world champion.

Practise
13:00 PM — 17 March 1994 — incomplete

Official training
9:00 AM trial round — 18 March 1994 — incomplete — 43 on start list

Official results
10:00 AM — 20 March 1994 — Two rounds — chronological order

 Points were officially scored maximum as 191 metres jump. World record. First official over 200 metres. Crash at world record distance. World record. Fall.

Ski flying world records

 Not recognized! Touch. First ever jump over 200 metres in history. First official (standing) jump over 200 metres in history.

Medal table

References

FIS Ski Flying World Championships
1994 in ski jumping
1994 in Slovenian sport
March 1994 sports events in Europe
Ski jumping competitions in Slovenia